Dongguan Rail Transit or Dongguan Metro is the rapid transit system of the city of Dongguan in Guangdong Province of China. It is operated by the state-owned Dongguan Rail Transit Corporation, Limited. The construction of the first section of Line 2 began on 26 March 2010, opening on 27 May 2016. Current plans call for some lines of the Dongguan Rail Transit to connect with the neighbouring Shenzhen Metro and Guangzhou Metro.

Lines in operation

Line 2 

The first section (15 stations and 37.743 km long) of Line 2 from Dongguan railway station in Shilong Town to Humen railway station in Humen Town opened on 27 May 2016. The line was called R2 in planning.

History

Preliminary planning 
In 2001, when he was with the party secretary of Dongguan, Tong Xing used the slogan "a big year for five years to see Metro". The vision to build the Dongguan Rail Transit system was first put on the agenda.

September 2003 to October 2004, China Academy of Urban Planning and Design Institute of Ministry of Railways,  "Dongguan Rail Transit Network Planning" project was launched.

November 2004, Dongguan City rail transit construction leading group was established, followed by the development of "Dongguan Rail Transit Network Plan" to be completed by 2020. Dongguan City plans to build a total length of 195 km, with the total number of stations to 55 of the rail network.

September 2006, "Dongguan city rapid rail transit construction planning" through the Provincial Development and Reform Commission, Department of Construction Review.

December 2006, plan submitted to the State Development and Reform Commission, Ministry of Construction;

February 2007, the mayor of Dongguan, Li Yuquan announced provincial government approval;

In 2006, September 25 to 26, "Dongguan city rapid rail transit construction plan" expert review meeting was held, "Dongguan city rapid rail transit construction plan" was approved by the specialists. The experts recommended that the goal is brought down to about 60 kilometres and give priority to the development of line No. 2. Experts also recommend Dongguan-Shenzhen inter-city lines and their routes overlap No. 1 line and for further research to make a unified coordination and optimization. It pointed out that the proposed R1 line with Guangzhou-Dongguan-Shenzhen inter-city line collinear operations should avoid duplication and wasteful investment. However the proposal was rejected, R1 line and Guangzhou-Dongguan-Shenzhen inter-city line to be built as separate lines.

July 2009, "Dongguan city rapid rail transit construction plan (2009-2015)" was put to the NDRC and the Ministry of Construction for approval. Approval was granted to build Metro Line 2 (R2 line), phase I and II ( Dongguan Station - Humen Station ), totaling 37.8 km. City rail transit construction project formally entered operational phase.
To cope with the Pearl River Delta region intercity rail transit construction plan, in 2010 the planning was further adjusted to increase planned line length to 218 kilometres and 76 stations. Network construction period was extended to 2025.

Construction of Line 2 
April 13, 2009, Dongguan railway station (formerly New Dasan Station) construction officially started, also the starting point of the Metro Line. The subway station hall project to be constructed simultaneously.

March 26, 2010, section 2304 standard test project held a groundbreaking ceremony, Dongguan Metro Line officially started.

December 8, 2014, the two shield tunnel borers break through to Shan Mei ~ Exhibition Centre, marking the second line main project completion. According to the plan, completion for trial operations is to be December 29, 2015. Opened 27 May 2016.

Future development 
Dongguan Rail Transit Line 1, Line 2 second phase and Line 3 feasibility study, survey, design and other preliminary work has begun. Construction of the Shenzhen section of Line 1 started as part of Shenzhen Metro's Phase IV expansion as the Line 6 branch line project. The first phase of Line 1 will start construction in September 2018 and the second phase of Line 2 extending it south to Chang'an will start construction in June 2019.

Rolling stock 

CRRC Guangdong, CRRC Nanjing Puzhen and Bombardier Transportation is supplying 6-car CIVAS metro trains for Dongguan. The first trains were built in Västerås, Sweden with the final assembly in Changzhou.

List of planned lines 
Line 1
Line 3
Line 4

Network Map

See also 
 Guangzhou Metro
 FMetro
 Shenzhen Metro
 List of metro systems

References

External links 
 Dongguan Rail Transit – official website  

 
Rail transport in Guangdong
Rapid transit in China
Transport in Dongguan
Underground rapid transit in China
2016 establishments in China